Stephen Kenworthy (6 November 1959 – 26 June 2001) was a Welsh professional footballer who played as a left-back. He made appearances in the English Football League for Wrexham and Bury. He also played for Welsh league club Bangor City.

References

1959 births
2001 deaths
Welsh footballers
Association football defenders
Wrexham A.F.C. players
Bury F.C. players
Bangor City F.C. players
English Football League players
Footballers from Wrexham